Akki Chennabasappa or (Akki Channabasappa) was an actor, known for the Kannada movie Humble Politician Nograj.

Early life
He was born to a couple Rudrappa Akki and Thayavva Akki. He spent his childhood in Ramdurg of Belagavi district. He joined the Ballari Lalithamma Drama Company at the age of 20 years before leaving for the Honnappa Bhagavathar company. In 1970 he left for the Gubbi Company and learnt dance from Kalpana, who was called Minugu Taare.

Personal life
He was married to Balanagamma and the couple had no children.

Filmography
Serials
 Ninnolumeyindale as Kiri Kiri Manja
 Silli Lalli

Movies
 Prakruthi
 See You
Kanasemba Kudureyanneri
 Jipuna Nanna Ganda
 Mussanje
 Humble Politician Nograj

Recognition
 Akki Chennabasappa was felicitated during the Actor Bharat Bhagavat Memorial Programme at KH Kala Soudha in Bengaluru on 4 November 2012. 
 Akki Chennabasappa was felicitated on 30 August 2015 during Janapada Jenkhara Geetostva, Janapada Folks Songs 2015, organized by Saneeta Sangama Trust at Udayabanu Kala Sangha in Bengaluru.

Death
Akki Chennabasappa died on 15 May 2018, in an old age home run by stage actor Ashok Basthi.

References

20th-century births
2018 deaths
Male actors in Kannada cinema
Indian male film actors
People from Belagavi district